Maria Grazia "Lella" Lombardi (26 March 1941 – 3 March 1992) was an Italian racing driver who participated in 17 Formula One World Championship Grands Prix. Lombardi is one of two female drivers to qualify for Formula One and is the only female who scored points in Formula One. Lombardi grew up in Italy and developed an interest in racing by driving a delivery van for her family. Starting in karting and moving to Formula Monza and Formula Three, Lombardi advanced through racing until she reached Formula One. She is the only woman to win points in Formula One, winning half a point in the Spanish Grand Prix. However, Lombardi had an eventful driving career, aside from Formula One. Lombardi was the first woman to qualify and compete in the Race of Champions in Brands Hatch and raced in sports cars. She won the 6 Hours of Pergusa and the 6 Hours of Vallelunga. Lombardi's story has impacted generations of racers. Her experience has shaped the involvement of women in racing and how people perceive females in the racing industry.

Personal life 
Lombardi was born in Frugarolo, a small town in Piedmont in Italy. Her father was a butcher, who gave Lella her first job as a delivery driver for the family's shop. At first, Lombardi’s father found her passion for racing hard to accept but embraced it once she finished runner-up in a 1968 race. Lella Lombardi was also one of the first female racers in a same-sex relationship. Lombardi died of breast cancer in Milan on March 3, 1992. She was 50 years old and was buried in Frugarolo. She was survived by her partner, Fiorenza. Lombardi is commemorated by a sculpture in her birthplace, Frugarolo.

Career

Formula One
After a brief experience with karting as a child, Lombardi bought her first car in 1965, racing in Formula Monza. She moved on to Formula Three in 1968. In 1974, Lombardi was signed to drive the Shellsport-Luxembourg Lola in F5000 and finished fourth. Initially, Lombardi tried to qualify for Formula One with a privately entered Brabham  supported by the Italian Automobile Club but failed to qualify. That winter, she met an Italian nobleman, Count Vittorio Zanon, who sponsored her entrance into F1. In 1975, Lombardi was invited to join Vittorio Brambilla and Hans-Joachim Stuck on the March engineering team, racing the full season with Zanon's Lavazza Coffee Company’s sponsorship. At the opening race of the campaign in South Africa, Lombardi became the first woman, since Maria Teresa de Filippis in 1958, to successfully qualify for a Grand Prix. 1975 would prove to be an eventful season for the March Team, as Lombardi scored a Championship point in the Spanish Grand Prix. However, this race only lasted 23 laps until Lombardi was forced to retire with a fuel system problem. The race suffered a major tragedy when the rear wing on Rolf Stommelen's Embassy Hill broke, sending him into the barrier. While trying to avoid Stommelen as he crossed the track, Carlos Pace crashed, and five spectators were killed by Stommelen's flying car. The race continued for another four laps, resulting in Lombardi’s sixth-place finish. With the race being stopped before three-fourths of the scheduled race distance was reached, only half points were awarded. Lombardi also successfully performed at other races, including the German Grand Prix at the Nürburgring, where she finished seventh. At the United States Grand Prix at Watkins Glen, Lombardi had a one-off drive for Williams. However, she was prevented from starting due to an ignition problem. 

In 1976, Lombardi was confirmed at March Engineering alongside Brambilla and Stuck. She finished 14th at the Brazilian Grand Prix that year, and subsequently, the team decided to replace her with Ronnie Peterson. Then, Lombardi briefly moved to RAM Racing, her best result being 12th at the Austrian Grand Prix.

Race of Champions
In 1974, Lombardi was the first female racing driver to qualify and compete at the Race of Champions in Brands Hatch. She raced a Lola-Chevrolet and finished 14th. In the 1975 event, she was once again able to qualify and compete with a March-Ford. She was retired after 20 laps.

Sports cars
Lombardi later raced in sports cars. In 1979, she won the 6 hours of Pergusa and the 6 hours of Vallelunga. She also competed four times at the 24 hours of Le Mans, where she finished 20th in 1976 in a Lancia Stratos Turbo.

Lombardi had also raced in the Firecracker 400 NASCAR race at the Daytona International Speedway in 1977. There were two other female drivers in the field: American Janet Guthrie and Belgian Christine Beckers. Lombardi finished 31st.

Lombardi retired from racing in 1988. In 1989 she founded her own racing team, Lombardi Autosport.

Legacy 
Lella Lombardi’s racing career has influenced the perceptions of subsequent generations of females in racing. Lombardi is considered an F1 trailblazer, after which women increasingly joined Formula One in many capacities aside from driving. According to The Multimedia Encyclopedia of Women in Today's World, because of Lella Lombardi, there are more women involved in other aspects of Formula One, especially "traditionally female" jobs such as modeling. Lombardi is also used as one of the reference points for females in racing. Journalist Phil Pash reports that though Lombardi viewed racing as a masculine sport, she succeeded regardless because of her ‘competitive spirit.’  Among others who comment on the effects of Lombardi’s legacy is Matt Majendie, who writes about Jamie Chadwick. Chadwick argues that for women entering Formula One in 2022, financial support is a greater obstacle than gender. Majendie argues this by citing Lombardi’s example as a racer, who despite her gender, successfully entered Formula One.  This need for financial support is combated by the rise of the W-series, which started in October 2018. The W-series is a women’s racing championship, which eliminates financial barriers, and gives equal opportunity to female racers. As an example of successful women produced by Formula One, Lombardi is credited with making Formula One accessible to women.

Racing record

Complete European F5000 Championship results
(key) (Races in bold indicate pole position; races in italics indicate fastest lap.)

Complete Formula One World Championship results
(key) (Races in bold indicate pole position; races in italics indicate fastest lap.)

Formula One non-championship results
(key) (Races in bold indicate pole position; races in italics indicate fastest lap.)

24 Hours of Le Mans results

Complete Shellsport International Series results
(key) (Races in bold indicate pole position; races in italics indicate fastest lap)

Complete British Formula One Championship results
(key) (note: results shown in bold indicate pole position; results in italics indicate fastest lap)

NASCAR
(key) (Bold – Pole position awarded by qualifying time. Italics – Pole position earned by points standings or practice time. * – Most laps led.)

Winston Cup Series

Complete Deutsche Tourenwagen Meisterschaft results
(key) (Races in bold indicate pole position) (Races in italics indicate fastest lap)

See also
List of female Formula One drivers
Driver Data Base profile

References

External links
 

1941 births
1992 deaths
People from Frugarolo
Italian racing drivers
Italian Formula One drivers
Italian female racing drivers
Italian Formula Three Championship drivers
24 Hours of Le Mans drivers
Deaths from cancer in Lombardy
March Formula One drivers
Williams Formula One drivers
RAM Racing Formula One drivers
World Sportscar Championship drivers
British Formula One Championship drivers
Italian LGBT sportspeople
Lesbian sportswomen
LGBT racing drivers
20th-century Italian LGBT people
Sportspeople from the Province of Alessandria